Jacobus Jan "Koos" Boomsma (born 1951) is a Dutch evolutionary biologist who studies social evolution and the evolution of mating systems.

Education 
Boomsma obtained an MSc and PhD degree in biology in 1976 and 1982 at the Vrije Universiteit Amsterdam.

Career 
Boomsma directs the Centre of Social Evolution and works as a professor of biology at the University of Copenhagen. He is known most recently for the monogamy hypothesis, which states that strict lifetime monogamy enabled the evolution of eusociality in the Hymenoptera (bees, ants, wasps, etc.). He has also lent influential contributions to the fields of mutualisms and sexual conflict and heads research programmes in evolutionary medicine, invasive social syndromes and fungal agriculture. He is a research associate at the Smithsonian Tropical Research Institute in Panama.

References

1951 births
Living people
Dutch biologists
Evolutionary biologists
Vrije Universiteit Amsterdam alumni
Academic staff of the University of Copenhagen